Brnjac is a settlement near the Serbian city of Loznica in the Mačva District. It has a population of 631.

Populated places in Mačva District